The 2010 Darts World Cricket Championship was the first and only darts Professional Darts Corporation tournament involving darts cricket. It took place on 26 June 2010 as the first event in the 2010 World Series of Darts Festival at the Tropicana Hotel in Las Vegas.

Phil Taylor defeated Mark Walsh in the final to claim his first and only world darts cricket title.

Prize money

Draw 
Last 64 players shown in bracket. In total there were about 140 entries.

See also
 World Series of Darts Festival

References

External links 
 World Cricket Championships at Darts Database

World Cricket Championship Darts
World Cricket Championship
World Cricket Championship 2010
Professional Darts Corporation tournaments
World Cricket Championship 2010